Amy Newman is translator, American poet, and professor. 
She is a Presidential Research Professor at Northern Illinois University.

Life
She graduated with a Ph.D. in English Literature and Language from Ohio University.

She is the author of five collections of poems, most recently On This Day in Poetry History (Persea Books). Her other books include Dear Editor, winner of the Lexi Rudnitsky Editor's Choice Award, fall, Camera Lyrica, winner of the Beatrice Hawley Award, and her first book, Order, or Disorder, which received the Cleveland State University Poetry Center Prize.

Newman has received fellowships in poetry from the MacDowell Colony and the Ohio and Illinois Arts Councils. In 2015 she was awarded the Friends of Literature Prize from The Poetry Foundation for her poem "Howl."

Her poems have appeared in literary journals and magazines, including The Kenyon Review, The Missouri Review, Hotel Amerika, The Ohio Review, Colorado Review, Denver Quarterly, The Gettysburg Review, Hayden's Ferry Review, Willow Springs, Indiana Review, The Carolina Quarterly, and The Connecticut Poetry Review, and in anthologies, including The Iowa Anthology of New American Poetries, The Rose Metal Press Field Guide to Prose Poetry: Contemporary Poets In Discussion and Practice, An Introduction To The Prose Poem, Lit from Inside: 40 Years of Poetry from Alice James Books, and The Hide-and-Seek Muse: Annotations of Contemporary Poetry. Her poetry has been translated and published in Italy and Romania.

Newman was named the poetry critic at the Chicago Sun-Times in October 2006 and in the same month served as online Poet-in-Residence for the British newspaper The Guardian. She has published articles on the poets Agha Shahid Ali, W. S. Merwin, Jean Valentine, Adrienne Rich, and Theodore Roethke.

Family
She lives in DeKalb with her husband, Joe Bonomo.

Published works

Full-length poetry collections
 On This Day in Poetry History (Persea Books, 2016)
 Dear Editor (Persea Books, 2012)
 fall (Wesleyan University Press, 2004/2006)
 Camera Lyrica (Alice James Books, 1999)
 Order, or Disorder (Cleveland State University Poetry Center, 1996)

Chapbooks
 The Sin Sonnets: A Redouble (Scantily Clad Press, 2009)
 The BirdGirl Handbook (Green Tower Press, 2006)

References

Sources
 Ohio University Department of English > Alumni: Amy Newman
 Alice James Books > Author Page > Amy Newman

External links
  Amy Newman on Twitter
 Poetry Foundation > "Howl"
 "Dear Editor/20 November" on PoemFlow
 NARRATIVE Poem of the Week > An incomplete Encyclopedia of Happiness and Unhappiness 
 Unsplendid > "Bones and Doubt"
 DIAGRAM > 3 Poems 
 diode > Reading Into > fall 2009
 The London Guardian Poem of the Week > Darwin's Unfinished Notes to Emma > June 2008
  Absent Magazine > Dear Editor > issue 2
 Reginald Shepard’s Blog > On Amy Newman > April 24, 2007
 Review: Bookslut.com Review by Sumita Sheth of Fall by Amy Newman > May 2005
 Ploughshares > Authors & Articles > Profile by Amy Newman of Jean Valentine > Winter 2008-09
 The Guardian > Thursday 5, October 2006 > Amy Newman's Poetry Workshop

Poets from New York (state)
Ohio University alumni
Northern Illinois University faculty
Living people
Year of birth missing (living people)
American women poets
American women academics
21st-century American women